Lil Rev (Marc Revenson), was born 1968 in Milwaukee, Wisconsin is a musician best known for his Yiddish music, and is also a renowned ukulele and harmonica player.

In 1984, he was given an old Wendell Hall Banjo Ukulele which started his passion for the instrument.

Since then, Lil Rev has released a series of books, focusing on ukulele and harmonica instruction, as well as providing instruction locally through workshops. His performances feature a multitude of instruments and story-telling.

Awards
2004 - "Best Folksinger Award" from the Wisconsin Area Music Industry.
1996 - National Blues Harmonica Champion

Instruments

Lil' Rev's instrument of choice is most often a Mya-Moe resonator ukulele in various sizes. He prefers the Hohner Special 20 for his harmonica playing.

Media

Discography

Solo 
 Ragged But Beautiful (1994)
 Mouth Organ Minstrel (1996)
 Blues for the People (1997)
 That Old Madness (1999)
 Sojourns & Sidewalks (2001)
 Fountain of Uke (2003)
 Fountain of Uke Vol. 2 (2005)
 Drop Baby, Drop, Patchwork Records (2009)
 Happiest Way to be Sad, Fountain of Uke Music (2011)
 Claw and Hammer, Fountain of Uke Records (2016)

Collaborations 
 Uke Town with Pig Ankle Dave, Lil Rev Music (1996)
 Around the Camp Fire Late At Night with Larry Penn (2010)

DVD 
 Showpieces with Lil' Rev

Books

Music Books 
 Easy Songs for Ukulele, Hal Leonard Corporation (September 1, 2008) 
 Hal Leonard Ukulele Method Book 1, Hal Leonard Corporation (December 1, 2005)  (Also available in Spanish)
 Hal Leonard Ukulele Method Book 2, Hal Leonard Corporation (September 1, 2008) 
 Play Harmonica Today, Hal Leonard Corporation (December 1, 2009) 
 101 Ukulele Licks, Hal Leonard Corporation (January 1, 2011) 
 Hal Leonard Baritone Ukulele Method Book 1, Hal Leonard Corporation (June 1, 2012) 
 Fiddle Tunes for Ukulele, Hal Leonard Corporation (November 1, 2014) 
 Essential Strums & Strokes for Ukulele: A Treasury of Strum-Hand Techniques, Hal Leonard Corporation (October 1, 2015) 
 Intros, Endings & Turnarounds for Ukulele: Spice Up Your Uke Repertoire with These Timeless Chestnuts, Hal Leonard (June 1, 2018) 
 Blue Arpeggios
 Lil' Rev's Strum Along Songbook
 Sing Song Daddy Songbook

Poetry 
 Lil' Red Poem Book
 Lil' Gold Poem Book
 Ukulele Nation

Appears in 
 Mighty Uke: The Amazing Comeback of a Musical Underdog

Notes

External links 
 Lil' Rev Official website
 Fountain of Uke - Lil' Rev's Blog

Musicians from Milwaukee
Writers from Milwaukee
1968 births
Living people
American ukulele players
American harmonica players